Kumar Majhi was an Indian politician. He was elected to the Lok Sabha, lower house of the Parliament of India from Keonjhar in Odisha as a member of the Indian National Congress.

References

External links
Official Biographical Sketch in Lok Sabha Website

Lok Sabha members from Odisha
India MPs 1971–1977
1943 births
Living people
Indian National Congress politicians from Odisha